Göteborg Film Festival (GFF), formerly Göteborg International Film Festival (GIFF), known in English as the Gothenburg Film Festival, formerly Gothenburg International Film Festival, is an annual film festival in Gothenburg, Sweden and the largest film event in Scandinavia. When it was launched in 1979 it showed 17 films on 3 screens and had 3,000 visitors. Today, the film festival takes place over 10 days each year at the end of January and beginning of February. In later years around 450 films from 60 countries are screened for 115,000 visitors. The film festival is also an important market place for the contractors in the movie industry.

Awards 
 the following prizes were awarded:

Dragon Awards
Dragon Award Best Nordic Film (Nordiska filmpriset)
Dragon Award Best Acting (since 2019)
Audience Dragon Award Best Nordic Film – (Nordiska Filmpriset – Publikens val)
Dragon Award Best Nordic Documentary (since 2013)
Dragon Award Best International Film 
 Honorary Dragon Award
 Nordic Honorary Dragon Award
 Dragon Award Best Swedish Short

Other awards
FIPRESCI Award
Sven Nykvist Cinematography Award, named for Sven Nykvist
The Ingmar Bergman International Debut Award, named for Ingmar Bergman
Draken Film Award (since 2022, for a Swedish short film)
Audience Choice Award for Best Swedish Short
Angelo Award, the Swedish Church's award
Nordisk Film & TV Fond Prize, awarded by the Nordisk Film & TV Fond, secretariat to the Nordic Council

Dragon Award for Best Nordic Film
The festival's main award is the Dragon Award for Best Nordic Film, which can be won for feature film productions from the Nordic countries. The following films have received the award:

Dragon Award for Best Nordic Documentary

Festival program 
The festival is made up of several film sections. Films are chosen in each category with the advice of a committee of film experts. Categories have included:

Animation featuring short and long animated films.

Documentaries

Debuts where debutees can be discovered.

Focus featuring a region or theme in focus for that year. In 2012 focus was on Arab film and the Arab Spring.

Festival Favorites is a selection of the most liked and prized films that have been shown at festivals throughout the world during the past year.

Five Continents showing films from all categories and unconditionally traveling the globe to find the best films.

Gala featuring great films, great directors, red carpets and Oscar nominees.

HBTQ – a collection of various films that all depict untraditional love or non-heterosexual roles.

Nordic Competition focusing on new Nordic feature-films competing for the festival's Nordic Film Prize (100,000 SEK).

Nordic Light including the best of the Sweden's four Nordic neighboring countries.

Swedish World Premiers with feature-films and documentaries being shown to general audiences for the first time.

Swedish Pictures often including circa 100 Swedish short-films.

Notes

External links
Official web page
English-language podcast (Radio Sweden)

Film festivals in Sweden
Film
Tourist attractions in Gothenburg
1979 establishments in Sweden
Film festivals established in 1979